Qira  was a Palestinian Arab village, located 23 kilometers southeast of Haifa. It was locally referred to as Qira wa Qamun.

Its people were Arab tenants, some of whom from the Bedouin tribes of Ka'abiye and Sa'adih. They settled the land during the late 19th century. The land of the village was owned by three Christian families from Beirut and Haifa. The land was purchased by the Yishuv in the 1920s and the villagers began evacuating. Yokneam Moshava and HaZore'a were built on former village land.

The occupation of Qira by pre-state Israeli forces on 1 March 1948 finished the evacuation process.

History
At least 19 archaeological sites were located within the village's territory, the most renowned of these being Tell Qira and Tell Qamun.

Ottoman period
In a map made by Pierre Jacotin during the French campaign in Egypt and Syria, Tell Qamun appeared under the name of Chateau d'El Kireh (Castle of Qira), and Qira appeared as Qairah. In his visit to Qamun and Qira, van de Velde found a church on Qamun, and then he searched for a castle in Qira, but when he arrived to the site, he only found ruins "which externally presented nothing of importance". He came to the conclusion Jacotine confounded the tell of Qamun with that of Qira.

In 1872 the Ottoman government sold the lands of Qira to the Christian Sursock family from Beirut (modern-day Lebanon) and later their part of the land was shared with the Tueni family, also from Beirut. In that year the PEF's Survey of Western Palestine visited, and noted about Khurbet Kireh "Evidently an ancient site. There are traces of ruins and broken pottery on the hill; to the north are kokim tombs, caves, and a quarry; to the east are other tombs, caves, quarries, and a rock-cut water channel, Umm el Hashurah. There is a good supply of water in the valley at this point, and a small mill. A colony of Turcomans live in the caves; they pronounce the name Jireh." The other part of the land was sold to the Khouri family from Haifa. According to Peretz Levinger's study of the establishment of the nearby town of Yokneam Moshava, it is unknown if the villagers came before or after the land was sold to the families. He assumes the Ottomans sold the land when it was uninhabited.

The Palestinian community in Qira began during the 19th century. The residents were tenant farmers, paying fees to the families who owned the land. The population was made of two groups: Arab fellaheen, who came from the nearby Arab villages, and Bedouin nomads. The bedouins came from two tribes: Ka'abiye and Sa'adih, who arrived to the land, according to elderly traditions during the 1870s and possibly in the 1860s. At the time they arrived, they consisted of only twelve families.

A population list from about 1887 showed that Kireh had about 65 inhabitants; all Muslims.

British Mandate period
The area was acquired by the Jewish community as part of the Sursock Purchase. In 1924, Zionist activist Yehoshua Hankin bought the share of the land owned by the Sursock and Tueni families. In February 1934 the remaining share, owned by the Khouri family was bought after a decade of negotiations.

The fellaheens were the first to evacuate their lands after receiving compensation and thus the population Qira decreased from 134 in 1922 to 86 in 1931 (in a total of  21  houses). The evacuation of the Bedouin tribes took much longer as they refused to leave their lands, especially after the fellaheens left the better parts of the territory, suitable for the Bedouin lifestyle. It was also delayed because the Arab landowners did not want to take responsibility for the evacuation, due to political reasons. In their lands they grew wheat, barley and sorghum.

Further negotiations in 1935 and 1936, including the intervention of influential Arab figures were interrupted by the break of the 1936–1939 Arab revolt. The act of selling lands to Jews was seen in the Arab community as treason, punishable by death. After the revolt, both tribes showed interest in the renewal of the negotiations after their leaders no longer felt a threat to their lives. The evacuation continued in 1936 and later that year the rest of the Ka'abiye tribe left. The last evacuation took place in 1945 when the leader of the Sa'adih tribe left for a large amount of money. The last of Qira's Muslim population lived between Yokneam Moshava and HaZore'a.

1948 and aftermath
According to Ilan Pappe in The Israel/Palestine Question (1999), the 140 tenant farmers of Qira wa Qamun evacuated the village in March on the "friendly advice" of the local Haganah intelligence officer at Yokneam, Yehuda Burstein. Benny Morris notes that Burnstein received the orders for the evacuation from Yosef Weitz. The Haganah Intelligence Report attributes the flight to "fear and the influence of attacks in the area," which Morris notes is "not really the same thing." Subsequent to the depopulation of the village, Weitz and his colleagues from the Jewish National Fund in the North, "decided to raze the tenants' houses, to destroy their crops, and to pay the evictees compensation."

Qira wa Qamun's inhabitants joined the first wave of the 1948 Palestinian exodus, displaced prior to the outbreak of the 1948 Arab-Israeli war. Today, the villagers and their descendants remain refugees. Following the war the area was incorporated into the State of Israel; Yokneam Illit was later established on the former lands of Qira.

See also
Vassals of the Kingdom of Jerusalem

References

Bibliography

 

 
 

 
Levinger, Perez (1987). Land purchase in Yokenam area affair (פרשת רכישת הקרקעות באזור יקנעם) (Catedra, p. 153 - 170)

External links
Welcome to Qira 
Qira (Qira and Qamun), Zochrot
Survey of Western Palestine, Map 8: IAA, Wikimedia commons 
Qira from the Khalil Sakakini Cultural Center
  

Arab villages depopulated prior to the 1948 Arab–Israeli War
Palestine-related articles needing attention
District of Haifa